The Comedy Writer is a 1998 novel by filmmaker Peter Farrelly.

The story revolves around Henry Halloran, a young man who quits his sales job in New England and moves to Los Angeles to pursue his dream of becoming a comedic screenwriter.  Henry's pursuit is an arduous one, involving many humiliating rejections, low-paying waitstaff jobs to pay the bills, and a grating, unwanted female roommate.

Because many of the exploits of the protagonist are similar or identical to Peter Farrelly's own life, it is believed that this novel is partly (or mostly) autobiographical.

Hollywood novels
1998 American novels
Novels about writers
American autobiographical novels